Bulandshahr, or, Sketches of an Indian district : social, historical and architectural (1884), is a book about the district of Bulandshahr, in the North-Western Provinces during British rule in India, authored by the then district magistrate and collector for the Indian Civil Service, Frederick Growse. It was published by Medical Hall Press, Benares, in 1884, and includes a description of Bulandshahr, an account of its history from antiquity to the 1857 rebellion, and of how the town was rebuilt under the supervision of Growse himself in the late 19th century.  

The account of the town built by local artisans brought Growse into dispute with the Public Works Department (PWD), who attempted to prevent the construction of his buildings. The British government in India's interpretation of the book, was that it praised indigenous architecture. Growse was subsequently transferred from Bulandshahr and further publications banned. Later appraisals of his work note it as unique in architectural literature.

Publication
Bulandshahr, or, Sketches of an Indian district : social, historical and architectural is a book about the district of Bulandshahr in India, and authored by British district magistrate and collector for the Indian Civil Service, Frederick Growse. It was published by Medical Hall Press of Benares in 1884 at a price of five rupees. Parts of it had been previously published in the Calcutta Review and in the Journal of the Asiatic Society of Bengal. The publication was followed by Growse's work titled Indian architecture of today as exemplified in new buildings in the Bulandshahr District (1885), in which he included press reviews of his 1884 book.

Content
The book has 90 pages beginning with a preface by Growse dated 12 July 1884. The epigraph on the title page recites Seeley in capital letters; "OUR WESTERN CIVILIZATION IS PERHAPS NOT ABSOLUTELY THE GLORIOUS THING WE LIKE TO IMAGINE IT." On the following page, also in all capital letters is a quote from Lord Beaconsfield: "THE LOCAL SENTMENT IN MAN IS THE STRONGEST PASSION IN HIS NATURE, IT IS THE PARENT OF MOST OF OUR VIRTUES".

Following a contents page and a page listing the eight illustrations in the book, there are three main parts; a description of Bulandshahr district titled "Bulandshahr, the district its characteristics and its capabilities", an account of its history from antiquity to the 1857 rebellion titled "History of the town of Bulandshahr District from its foundation to the mutiny of 1857 A. D.", and of how the town of Bulandshahr was rebuilt under the supervision of Growse himself titled "The rebuilding of Bulandshahr". 

The appendices display the names of those that provided finances for the building of the Bathing Ghat, and the Lyall tank named for Alfred Comyn Lyall. This is followed by press notices on Growse's publications of the English translation of the Ramayana of Tulsidas, and his Mathurá: A district memoir (1880).

Illustrations

Images in the book include a photograph of the Bathing Ghat. Other building descriptions include the Garden Gate and Town Hall. Growse states that an executive engineer informed the British government in India in 1878 that the bathing ghat would be an "eye-sore" that obscured the view of the bridge, resulting in a two-year delay of construction.

Reception
The account of the town built by local artisans brought Growse into dispute with the governmental Public Works Department (PWD), who condemned the construction of his buildings and attempted to prevent them. The British government in India's interpretation of the book was that it praised indigenous architecture and endorsed Indian autonomy. Growse was subsequently transferred from Bulandshahr and further publications of the book were banned. 

The book was seen by the press to demonstrate Growse's feelings towards the local people. He was generally seen as sympathetic towards Indians; rich or poor. A review in The Indian Antiquary (1885) felt the book's part in the rebuilding of the town of particular interest and praised Growse's work, but felt he went too far in assuming that left to their own devices, "natives" would merely copy European buildings. The Saturday Review of Politics, Literature, Science, and Art described the first two chapters on the description and history of Bulandshahr as "fairly instructive and accurate", but lacked information on "statistics of crime, or cattle-stealers, or notices of fauna and flora". The Indian Statesman called the work  "painstaking research into the history and present condition of an Indian district and honest endeavour to utilise as far as possible its indigenous resources for the benefit of the inhabitants". Growse's obituary in the journal of the Royal Asiatic Society of Great Britain and Ireland described the work as "chiefly interesting as showing how he was able to transfer his sympathies from a Hindu to a Musulman population, when the requirements of a bureaucratic regime compelled his removal". 

The impact of the book was largely seen only after Growse's return to England. Professor of architecture Miki Desai described the book as a "unique example" of architectural literature, with Growse allowing and fostering "the local craftsmanship with little intervention and created Indian imagery of British 'patronage'". Ulrich Stark, professor and scholar of Hindi literature, has pointed out the book's epigraph, which she says captures "his [Growse's] admiration of Indian civilization".

Notes

References

External links

1884 non-fiction books
19th-century history books
History books about India
Books about British India
Books about cities
Architecture books